Sir Frank Madden (29 November 1847 – 17 February 1921) was an Irish-born Australian politician who served as the Speaker of the Victorian Legislative Assembly.
Madden was born in Cork to solicitor John Madden and Margaret Macoboy. His family migrated to Melbourne in 1857; Madden subsequently worked as a jackeroo near Skipton before becoming a solicitor. In 1874 he married Annie Eliza Francis, with whom he had seven children. He founded the firm of Madden & Butler and also served as president of the Law Institute from 1886 to 1887.

Madden was elected to the Victorian Legislative Assembly in 1894, representing Eastern Suburbs. He transferred to Boroondara in 1904, and was elected Speaker. He was knighted in 1911, and remained in the Speaker's chair until his defeat in 1917. Madden died in Kew in 1921.

Madden was a close friend of the poet Adam Lindsay Gordon and walked home with Gordon from Melbourne to St Kilda (in the years before public trams were introduced to Melbourne) on the night before Gordon's suicide in June 1870.

References

1847 births
1921 deaths
Nationalist Party of Australia members of the Parliament of Victoria
Members of the Victorian Legislative Assembly
Speakers of the Victorian Legislative Assembly
Australian Knights Bachelor
Politicians awarded knighthoods
People from Cork (city)
Irish emigrants to colonial Australia